Ambrosio Rianzares Bautista y Altamira (December 7, 1830 – December 4, 1903), also known as Don Bosyong, was a Filipino lawyer and author of the Declaration of Philippine Independence. A distant relative of the Rizal family, Bautista often gave advice to José Rizal, a Filipino nationalist, while studying in Manila.

Early life and career
Bautista was born in Biñan, Laguna, to Gregorio Enriquez Bautista and Silvestra Altamira. He attended preparatory school in Biñan and studied law at the University of Santo Tomas, obtaining a degree in 1865. He then practiced law in Manila and offered free legal services to poor clients. Whilst practicing law, Bautista, on his way to Malolos, Bulacan, was captured by a group of bandits, who subsequently learned that he had saved many of their friends as a defender of the poor in court cases against rich Filipinos and Spaniards. The bandits apologized to Bautista and set him free.

Political activism
Bautista solicited funds to finance a campaign for reforms in the Philippines, later becoming a member of the La Liga Filipina, Cuerpo de Compromisarios and La Propaganda. In 1896, the Spaniards arrested and imprisoned him at Fort Santiago, as he was suspected of being involved in the Philippine Revolution; Bautista elected to defend himself and was later released from prison.

In 1898, Bautista became the first adviser to President Emilio Aguinaldo and subsequently wrote the Declaration of Philippine Independence. 

Contrary to common belief, it was Bautista, and not Aguinaldo, who waved the Philippine flag before the jubilant crowd on June 12, 1898, during the Philippines Proclamation of Independence in Cavite.

On July 14, 1899, Bautista was elected to the position of president in Tarlac's Revolutionary Congress and was later appointed judge of the Court of First Instance of Pangasinan.

In popular culture
 Portrayed by Richard Manabat in the 2012 film, El Presidente.

See also
Patricio Mariano

Further reading 
Bautista Rianzares Ambrosio. 1830 - 1903 (accessed on September 10, 2007)
Quirino, Carlos. Who's Who in Philippine History. New York: Home Books. 1995.
National Historical Institute. Historical Markers: Regions I-IV and CAR. Manila: National Historical Institute. 1993
"Southern Luzon and Bicol: Ambrosio Rianzares Bautista." Unsung Heroes of the Philippines Revolution - MSC Communications Technologies, Inc.. (accessed September 12, 2007).

References

1830 births
1903 deaths
19th-century Filipino lawyers
Filipino revolutionaries
People from Biñan
People of the Philippine Revolution
University of Santo Tomas alumni
Filipino prisoners and detainees
20th-century Filipino judges
Spanish-language writers of the Philippines
Members of the Malolos Congress